The Impossible (translit. El Mustahil) is a 1965 Egyptian drama film starring Nadia Lutfi and directed by Hussein Kamal. The film was selected as the Egyptian entry for the Best Foreign Language Film at the 38th Academy Awards, but was not accepted as a nominee. The Impossible is a member of the Top 100 Egyptian films list.

Cast
 Nadia Lutfi
 Kamal el-Shennawi
 Salah Mansour

See also
 CIFF Top 100 Egyptian films
 List of Egyptian films of the 1960s
 List of submissions to the 38th Academy Awards for Best Foreign Language Film
 List of Egyptian submissions for the Academy Award for Best Foreign Language Film

References

External links
 

1965 films
1965 drama films
Egyptian drama films
Egyptian black-and-white films
1960s Arabic-language films
Films directed by Hussein Kamal